Pristava is a small settlement in the hills south of Borovnica in the Inner Carniola region of Slovenia.

References

External links

Pristava on Geopedia

Populated places in the Municipality of Borovnica